John Alfred Gray-Spence (1910-1992) was an Australian rugby league and rugby union player from the 1930s and 1940s.

Jack Grey-Spence was a brilliant winger for the Sydney University rugby league team. He played two seasons with them in 1933–1934, and Gray-Spence was the NSWRFL top try scorer in 1933. He moved to St George Dragons in 1935 before retiring from rugby league. Jack switched to rugby and played for St. George and Randwick rugby union clubs into the 1940s. He also represented New South Wales in Rugby.

Jack Grey-Spence died on 5 May 1992, aged 82.

References

Australian rugby league players
Sydney University rugby league team players
St. George Dragons players
1910 births
1992 deaths
Australian rugby union players
Rugby league wingers
Rugby league players from Sydney